The Simpsons Movie: The Music is a soundtrack album for the 2007 film The Simpsons Movie. It was composed by German film composer Hans Zimmer. The soundtrack was released on July 24, 2007, by Adrenaline Music Group and peaked at number 108 on the Billboard 200 chart. A limited edition version (with a donut-shaped packaging) was released on July 31, 2007. Critics have given the album generally positive reviews.

Background
Producer James L. Brooks chose Zimmer to compose the film's score, as they were good friends and regular collaborators. Regular Simpsons composer Alf Clausen was not asked to score the film. Zimmer was composing for Pirates of the Caribbean: At World's End at the same time as he did The Simpsons Movie. He told The Hollywood Reporter that he liked "using all his creative juices at once." Zimmer felt that the score was a "unique challenge", and he had to "try and express the style of The Simpsons without wearing the audience out". He used Danny Elfman's original opening theme from the series, but did not wish to overuse it.

For the soundtrack, Zimmer created themes for each member of the family. Homer's leitmotif was a major focus, and he also composed smaller themes for Bart and Marge. Zimmer asked arranger Michael A. Levine to turn the Spider-Pig song into a choral piece, which, at the time, had no place in the film. Later, Brooks decided to use it for the scene in which Homer has a psychedelic epiphany and then, again, as the first number in the closing credits. The lyrics of the piece were translated for the 32 dubbed versions of the song when the film was released internationally. The same choir learned to sing the piece for each of the foreign-language dubs. Levine also composed and arranged the music for when Homer and Marge make love with the help of Alaskan wildlife. The piece features soprano Elin Carlson singing all three parts of a vocal trio.

Reception

The soundtrack was released on July 24, 2007. It debuted and peaked at number 108 on the Billboard 200, and stayed on the chart for three weeks. It also reached number ten on Billboards Independent Albums chart and number eight on the Top Soundtracks chart. The "Spider Pig" song from the album charted in several countries, reaching number eight on New Zealand's Top 40 Singles Chart,   fourteen on Norway's VG-lista, twenty-three on the UK Singles Chart, and fifty-three on the Swedish Singles Chart.

The soundtrack has received generally favorable reviews from critics. Stephen Thomas Erlewine of Allmusic wrote that "the zany, zesty work of Alf Clausen has been traded in for the lush, symphonic touch of Hans Zimmer, who manages to retain enough of the spirit of the show but gives it a full-fledged widescreen makeover. In other words, this soundtrack is a traditional score [...] and even with titles as wacky as 'Doomsday Is Family Time,' 'Thank You Boob Lady,' and 'Why Does Everything I Whip Leave Me?,' the soundtrack doesn't sound all that humorous. It merely sounds like the sweeping yet sensitive mood music to a movie. And on those terms, The Simpsons Movie is a very good soundtrack — perhaps not as clever as Clausen, but it's still light on its feet while having enough pomp and circumstance to justify being shown on such a larger screen."

Track listing

Additional music by Ryleand Allison, Lorne Balfe, James Dooley, Henry Jackman, Michael Levine, Alti Orvarsson, and Heitor Pereira

Orchestra conducted by Nick Glennie Smith and Blake Neely

Charts

References

The Simpsons soundtrack albums
2007 soundtrack albums
Hans Zimmer soundtracks
Comedy film soundtracks
Animated film soundtracks
Albums with cover art by Matt Groening